Back to Me may refer to:

Back to Me (Cueshé album), 2006
Back to Me (Fantasia album), 2010
Back to Me (Howie Dorough album), 2011
Back to Me (Kathleen Edwards album), 2005
"Back to Me" (Lindsay Lohan song), 2020
"Back to Me" (Marian Hill and Lauren Jauregui song), 2016
"Back to Me", a song by Daya from Daya, 2015
"Back to Me", a song by the All-American Rejects from When the World Comes Down, 2008
"Back2Me", a song by Eraserheads from Cutterpillow, 1995